Ancient history is the aggregate of past events from the beginning of recorded human history to the Early Middle Ages or the Postclassical Era.

Ancient History may also refer to:
 Ancient History (novel), a novel by Joseph McElroy
 Ancient History (play), a one-act play by David Ives
 "Ancient History" (song), a song by Prairie Oyster
 "Ancient History" (Justice League Unlimited), a television episode